Hope in Hell is the fifteenth studio album by Canadian heavy metal band Anvil. It was released in 2013 on May 24 in Germany, May 27 in the rest of Europe, and May 28 in North America. The album was produced by Bob Marlette, who, according to frontman Steve "Lips" Kudlow, contributed a lot to songwriting and arrangements with his skills. All songwriting credits went to Lips and Robb Reiner alone. In some songs, Lips was inspired by his love of "heavy rock 'n' roll", which made him feel he "found his way home" to the time when they did their first record, Hard 'n' Heavy. It is the only Anvil album to feature bassist Sal Italiano.

Release and reception 

The album sold just under 800 copies in the first week of its release in the United States. It has received mostly lukewarm reception from fans.

Track listing

Personnel 
Anvil
Steve "Lips" Kudlow – vocals, lead guitar
Sal Italiano – bass
Robb Reiner – drums

Production
Bob Marlette – producer, engineer, mixing
Chris Marlette – digital editing, engineer
Kyle Hoffmann – assistant engineer
Maor Appelbaum – mastering

Charts

References 

Anvil (band) albums
2013 albums
Albums produced by Bob Marlette
The End Records albums
SPV/Steamhammer albums